Agathenburg (German: Bahnhof or Haltestelle Agathenburg) is a rapid transit railway station, located in the Agathenburg village, Lower Saxony. The trains of the Hamburg S-Bahn serve the station with the line S3 from Pinneberg via Hamburg-Altona station and central station to Stade.

See also
 List of Hamburg S-Bahn stations

References

External links

Hamburg S-Bahn stations in Lower Saxony
Buildings and structures in Stade (district)
Railway stations in Germany opened in 1881